is a Japanese actor and singer, best known for his role as Takumi Inui/Kamen Rider Faiz in Kamen Rider 555. He plays many musical instruments including the guitar, bass, drums and the piano. His album "HOMEMADE" was released in 2017, and his album  was released in 2018.

Filmography

Anime
Prayers (2005; OVA) – Tasuku

Drama
Kamen Rider 555 (2003 - 2004) – Kamen Rider Faiz / Takumi Inui
Hana Yori Dango (2005) – Seto Mamoru (episode 5)
Engine Sentai Go-onger (2008; tokusatsu)– Retsutaka (guest)
Kamen Rider Zi-O (2018) – Kamen Rider Faiz / Takumi Inui

Film
Kamen Rider 555: Paradise Lost (2003) – Takumi Inui / Kamen Rider Faiz / Wolf Orphnoch
Drift 3: TAKA (2006) – Takao
Drift 4: HAYABUSA (2007) – Takao
Engine Sentai Go-onger: Boom Boom! Bang Bang! GekijōBang!! (2008) – Retsutaka
Heisei Riders vs. Shōwa Riders: Kamen Rider Taisen feat. Super Sentai (2014) – Takumi Inui / Kamen Rider Faiz, Riderman (Voice)
Super Hero Taisen GP: Kamen Rider 3 (2015) – Takumi Inui / Kamen Rider Faiz
d-Video Special: Kamen Rider 4 (2015) - Takumi Inui / Kamen Rider Faiz, Great Leader of SHOCKER
Musashi (2019) - Nagaoka Okinaga

References

External links
 

1984 births
Living people
Japanese male actors
Kamen Rider
Actors from Hyōgo Prefecture
People from Kobe